Cevahir is a Turkish name and may refer to:

 Mustafa Cevahir, Turkish footballer
 Cevahir Mall, Shopping mall in Istanbul

Turkish-language surnames